Laura Wheelwright (born 10 September 1990) is an Australian actress best known for her role in the 2010 feature film Animal Kingdom.

Career 
Wheelwright's first major acting credit was in Animal Kingdom, a 2010 Australian film in which she played Nicky Henry, and was nominated for Best Performing Actress at the 2010 AFI Awards for the role. She was 18 years old and midway through an acting course at Melbourne-based 16th Street Acting Studio when she received the part and continued her acting studies following the completion of the film. She went on to play the female supporting lead in the 2012 Network Ten docudrama Underground: The Julian Assange Story for which she received an AACTA nomination for Best Guest or Supporting Actress in a Television Drama. She won the a Best Female Actor award at the 2013 Tropfest short film festival for her part in the winning film We've All Been There. She plays a Canadian tourist in season 2 of the television series Wolf Creek.

Filmography

References

External links

1990 births
Living people
Australian film actresses
Australian television actresses
21st-century Australian actresses